Goro is a major mining settlement in South Province, New Caledonia. The Goro mine is one of the world's biggest nickel mines.

Climate

Goro has a tropical rainforest climate (Köppen climate classification Af).

References

Populated places in New Caledonia
Mines in New Caledonia